The Looking Glass War is a 1970 British neo-noir action-thriller film directed by Frank Pierson based on the 1965 novel by John le Carré The Looking Glass War.

Plot
After an MI6 agent carrying a roll of film containing flyover photographs of the East German town of Kalkstadt is found dead and the film goes missing, MI6 concludes he was killed by the Stasi to cover up the presence of a new rocket system based on the V-2. The rocket was previously spotted in vague, on-the-ground photos, and if real, its existence would be a violation of international agreements. A source entices MI6 with another set of photos that conclusively confirms the rocket's existence, and only after receiving payment does he reveal that the photos are being held in Kalkstadt itself by his father. MI6 members John Avery, Haldane, and their superior LeClerc hatch a plan to retrieve the photos and verify the rocket by sending a lone operative over the East German border to Kalkstadt. Polish defector Leiser, who illegally entered England to be with a woman who is bearing his child, is vetted for the role by MI6 and offered UK citizenship if he agrees to work for them. Leiser accepts to be with his child.

Leiser is quickly trained in self-defense and survival skills at an MI6 safehouse, and taught how to use a portable radio transmitter to send coded messages. Not long before the mission, however, he briefly escapes his handlers to meet with his girlfriend. When she tells him that she had their child aborted, Leiser is deeply distraught and loses the motivation to carry out the mission, but changes his mind after bonding with Avery over a night of drinking. Leiser crosses the border into East Germany under cover of night, while the MI6 agents monitor for his radio messages from a West German cabin. On the way in, Leiser cuts his hand badly on the barbed wire fence and is forced to kill a young East German border guard who sees him. In the morning, the dead border guard is discovered and becomes a major news story.

Leiser is picked up by a lorry driver, but kills the driver after he demands sexual favours for the ride.  Leiser continues driving the lorry until he passes out from exhaustion, at which point a local girl and her brother board and drive for him. When the lorry is stopped at a military checkpoint, the girl covers for Leiser, but the soldiers still run his papers. The Stasi immediately notice inconsistencies in Leiser's circumstances and identify him as the person who breached the border and killed the guard, but the soldiers are ordered to let him go so that his intentions can be determined. At a lake, the girl submerges the lorry and Leiser leaves the girl and her brother behind.

In Kalkstadt, Leiser finally reaches his destination, but learns that the photographs never existed and MI6's source was a con artist. Despondent and feverish from his infected hand, Leiser attempts to leave town but is stopped by the Stasi, who tell him that the roads are closed and he must stay at a hotel. He reunites with the girl and is taken to her apartment, where she explains that she knows he is from the West and wants to leave the country with him. That night, the MI6 operation is ordered to shut down since it caused an international incident; at the same time, Leiser witnesses the East German rocket being transported through Kalkstadt's streets. As Leiser frantically relays his observation over radio, the Stasi pick up his transmission and triangulate his location, then gun him and the girl down. At the West German cabin, Avery is disillusioned by LeClerc's revelation that Leiser had always been considered expendable; he was given an obsolete radio to make it seem he was working alone, and he was denied a pistol so the West could not be accused of an act of war. In the end, it is implied that the East German rocket was only an elaborate bluff intended to provoke the West. The roll of film lost by the dead MI6 agent is found by a group of children who open it up and destroy it while playing.

Cast
Christopher Jones as Leiser
Pia Degermark as The Girl
Ralph Richardson as LeClerc
Paul Rogers as Haldane
Anthony Hopkins as John Avery
Susan George as Susan
Ray McAnally as Undersecretary of State
Robert Urquhart as Johnson
Anna Massey as Avery's Wife
Vivian Pickles as Mrs. King
Maxine Audley as Mrs. LeClerc
Cyril Shaps as East German Detective
Michael Robbins as Truck Driver
Timothy West as Taylor
Frederick Jaeger as The Pilot
Peter Swanwick as Finnish Policeman
Paul Maxwell as CIA Man
Guy Deghy as Fritsche
Ernest Walder as Radio Engineer
Patrick Wright as East German Policeman (VoPo)
Sylva Langova as East German Woman
David Scheur as Russian Officer
Allan McClelland as Doctor
Angela Down as Chelsea Girl
Robert Wilde as English Policeman
Nicholas Stewart as German Boy
Linda Hedger as Taylor's Child
Russell Lewis as Avery's Child

See also
 List of British films of 1970

External links

1970 films
British spy films
Cold War spy films
Films based on works by John le Carré
Films directed by Frank Pierson
1970s thriller drama films
1970s spy films
1970s action thriller films
1970s English-language films
1970s German-language films
Films based on British novels
British action thriller films
British thriller drama films
Films about the Secret Intelligence Service
Columbia Pictures films
1970 drama films
Films set in East Germany
Films about the KGB
1970 multilingual films
British multilingual films
1970s British films